Jason Wood may refer to:

Jason Wood (baseball) (born 1969), former Major League Baseball player
Jason Wood (comedian) (1972–2010), British comedian
Jason Wood (musician), lead singer of metalcore band It Dies Today
Jason Wood (politician) (born 1968), Australian politician
Jason Wood (writer), British writer